Leonhard "Lony" Seiderer (1 November 1895 – 3 July 1940) was a German football forward who played for 1. FC Nürnberg and SpVgg Fürth.

Seiderer started his career with Nürnberg before joining Fürth in 1917. He played 196 league games for the club, scoring 130 goals, and won the German football championship in 1926. He also represented the Germany national team, winning eight caps and scoring five goals between 1920 and 1924.

He later coached Germania Nürnberg, ASV Nürnberg, Wacker München, 1. FC Schweinfurt 05, SpVgg Fürth and VfB Stuttgart.

Honours
 German football championship: 1926

References

External links
 
 
 

1895 births
1940 deaths
Footballers from Nuremberg
Association football forwards
German footballers
Germany international footballers
1. FC Nürnberg players
SpVgg Greuther Fürth players
German football managers
SpVgg Greuther Fürth managers
VfB Stuttgart managers